During the 2007–08 Spanish football season, Valencia CF competed in La Liga, the Copa del Rey and the UEFA Champions League. Finally, Valencia won the Copa del Rey this season.

Overview 
Valencia started the season with coach Quique Sánchez Flores. Valencia's good start were cut short in early season due to slump and thus Sánchez Flores was fired for poor performance, however after his replacement, Ronald Koeman, became the new coach, the team turned to be worse. Koeman did not use Santiago Cañizares, Miguel Ángel Angulo nor David Albelda, which resulted into many affairs out of the playground. Although Valencia won Copa del Rey as a consolation prize, Koeman was fired for his bad performance in La Liga. Voro, who was born in Valencia and played for Valencia in his career, took the place of Koeman and helped the team to avoid relegation to the Second Division with four wins and one loss.

Section by manager

Quique Sánchez Flores  
On 29 October 2007, the Valencia board of directors fired Sánchez Flores after a string of average results with poor performances, including a 3–0 defeat at Sevilla followed by a second successive loss in the UEFA Champions League.

Óscar Fernández 
In 2007, Valencia fired coach Sánchez Flores and replaced him with Fernández as interim head coach. After his last game with Valencia when the beat Mallorca 2-0 with 2 goals from Fernando Morientes, after the match he said, "I am very happy. I want to dedicate this victory to the fans of Valencia who have suffered, they deserves everything. Alexis also and above all to the team. They are football players committed to the cause and I thank them. As for the match, the team has been extraordinary and my defense has been composed by Morentin and Timo Hildebrand. Manuel Fernandes has helped the team, in defense and is the one to praise. As for Alexis, you may have some injury, but until Monday, we cannot say anything."

After that game Fernández was sacked and went to manage the B team for new first-team coach Ronald Koeman.

Ronald Koeman 
On 31 October 2007, Koeman agreed to be the new coach of Valencia after the sacking of Sánchez Flores, effective 5 November 2007. With Valencia, he won the Copa del Rey, a tournament he previously won as a player with Barcelona. This was Valencia's first Copa del Rey title since 1999. However, the remainder of his tenure at Valencia would prove disappointing: the team would slump to 15th in the league, only two points above the relegation zone, as well as finishing bottom of their Champions League group. A 5–1 defeat by Athletic Bilbao would prove the final straw for Koeman's time with Valencia. He was sacked the following day, on 21 April 2008.

Voro  
On 21 April 2008, after several years working with Valencia as match delegate, Voro became manager of his former team following the sacking of Koeman. After having guided his team to its Copa del Rey victory, however, he was replaced by Unai Emery for the 2008–09 season and reinstated in his previous post.

Squad

Competitions

La Liga

Top goalscorers 
David Villa scored 18 goals, two of which were penalties, and ranked fourth (tied with Real Madrid's Raúl with 18 goals) in La Liga's goalscoring table. (Daniel Güiza won the Pichichi Trophy with 27 goals.) Villa scored on hat-trick, on 11 May 2008 against Levante.

Matches 

Match day 38, Valencia 3:1 Atlético Madrid 
Georgios Seitaridis 11' 1:0 
David Villa 40' 2:0 
David Villa 55' 3:0 
Sergio Agüero 76' 3:1

League table

Copa del Rey 

The Final was held at the Estadio Vicente Calderón in Madrid, in which Valencia CF lifted the trophy for the seventh time in their history with a 3–1 victory over Getafe CF.

This is the 7th title that Valencia won in Copa del Rey. Žigić, Joaquín and Mata are top goalscorers of the team in this Cup with 4 goals.

UEFA Champions League

Third qualifying round 
Valencia beat Sweden's Elfsborg with 5:1. First leg result is 3–0 and second 2–1. In the first leg at Mestalla, David Villa's shot was only parried by Johan Wiland and Vicente pounced on the rebound. There are two heads later by David Silva and Fernando Morientes and either are from Joaquín's cross. In the second leg, Helguera scored when unmarked with just five minutes on the clock. Elfsborg battle bravely, and Alexandersson found the net on half an hour. Villa scored for Valencia in the final seconds to fix the result to be 5:1 and qualify for Champions League Group stage.

Group Stage in Group B 

Only two goals in group stage. The away goal is by David Villa in the first match. Villa stole the ball in goalkeeper's hands with right foot against Schalke 04 and this match is the only victory in group stage. The only goal in Mestalla is by Villa as well. Villa scored early at about ten minutes of the Match against Chelsea. Valencia was reversed by Cole and Drogba's goals. Valencia scored no goals in four games later.

References 

2007-08
Valencia CF